Hanif Abdurrauf Sjahbandi (born 7 April 1997, in Bandung) is an Indonesian professional footballer who plays as a midfielder for Liga 1 club Persija Jakarta and the Indonesia national team.

Early career
His parents first enrolled Hanif into the Asian Soccer Academy (ASA) but found it unsatisfactory and eventually established their own football school called TwoTouch Football Academy to develop their child's talents. In July 2009, Hanif participated in a Manchester United Soccer School (MUSS) summer course in Indonesia, in which he was selected as one of the best students in his age group (12). That led him to an invitation to participate in MUSS's World Skills Final in December 2009.

Club career

Persipasi Bandung Raya
Hanif's professional career started when he joined Persipasi Bandung Raya in the 2015 Indonesia President's Cup, a year before the club changed owners and became Madura United. Playing as an energetic midfielder, Hanif emerged as one of the young players who attracted public attention. After this tournament, agents took him overseas to follow training in several clubs, including J1 League club FC Tokyo.

Persiba Balikpapan
After his overseas training stints, Hanif in 2016 returned to Indonesia and joined Persiba Balikpapan. Persiba at that time participated in the 2016 Indonesia Soccer Championship A, a competition that replaced the abandoned 2015 Indonesia Super League. He made his first goal when Persiba went against Persegres Gresik United on October 26, 2016, in week 26 of the championship.

Arema FC
After the ISC evolved into Indonesia's current top-tier football league, Liga 1 (Indonesia), in 2017, Hanif joined Arema FC, which initially contracted him for two years. He was recommended by coach Aji Santoso to replace Dutch-born Indonesia national football team regular Raphael Maitimo. Despite the cancellation of the 2020 Liga 1 competition due to the COVID-19 pandemic that led to a year of no professional football activities in Indonesia, Arema kept Hanif who has grown into an important part of its midfield.

Persija Jakarta
Sjahbandi was signed for Persija Jakarta to play in Liga 1 in the 2022–23 season. He made his league debut on 31 July 2022 in a match against Persis Solo at the Patriot Candrabaga Stadium, Bekasi.

International career
Hanif was among the 23 players who coach Eduard Tjong called for the Indonesia U-19 team that played in the 2014 AFF U-19 Youth Championship in Vietnam. While the team lost all of their group matches, Hanif emerged into a player who regularly won calls for subsequent junior-level national teams. Hanif made his international debut for the senior team on 21 March 2017 in a friendly match against Myanmar.

Career statistics

Club

International

International goals
International under-23 goals

Honours

Club 
Arema
 Indonesia President's Cup: 2017, 2019

International 
Indonesia U-23
 Southeast Asian Games  Bronze medal: 2017
 AFF U-22 Youth Championship: 2019
Indonesia
 Aceh World Solidarity Cup runner-up: 2017

References

External links
 
 

1997 births
Living people
Indonesian footballers
Sportspeople from Bandung
Sportspeople from West Java
Liga 1 (Indonesia) players
Pelita Bandung Raya players
Persiba Balikpapan players
Arema F.C. players
Persija Jakarta players
Indonesia youth international footballers
Indonesia international footballers
Association football midfielders
Association football central defenders
Southeast Asian Games bronze medalists for Indonesia
Southeast Asian Games medalists in football
Footballers at the 2018 Asian Games
Competitors at the 2017 Southeast Asian Games
Asian Games competitors for Indonesia